Brăila is a city in Muntenia, eastern Romania.

Brăila or Braila may also refer to:
 Brăila County, whose seat is Brăila
 Brăila, a village in the commune of Băcioi, Moldova
 Brăila Power Station, a thermal power plant
 Great Brăila Island, an island on the Danube river in Brăila County
 Port of Brăila, Brăila
 Ștefan Mihăilescu-Brăila (1925–1996), Romanian actor
 Volodymyr Braila (born 1978), Ukrainian footballer

See also
 ACS Dacia Unirea Brăila, an association football club based in Brăila
 HC Dunărea Brăila, a women's handball club based in Brăila
 Franco-Româna Brăila, a defunct association football club based in Brăila
 Balta Mică a Brăilei Natural Park, Brăila County